Dear Bruce Springsteen is a juvenile fiction novel published in 1987 by Kevin Major. It consists of the letters of 14-year-old Terry Blanchard to his idol, Bruce Springsteen, in which he talks about his problems as a youth.

References
Book review

1987 Canadian novels
Canadian young adult novels
Epistolary novels
Bruce Springsteen